Peters Beach or Peter Beach is a former barrier island located on the Jersey Shore of the Atlantic Ocean in Atlantic County, New Jersey, United States. It is now a part of Brigantine Island.

Geography
Peter Beach is on the southwestern portion of Brigantine Island, adjacent to St. George's Thoroughfare. It forms a section of Brigantine City.

Formerly a separate island, it was described in 1834 as,

Although Peters Beach measured about 1.5 miles (2.4 km) between inlets in 1828, by 1878 erosion had taken its toll, viz.,

By 1904, Quarters Inlet had taken on an "S" shape, curving in front of Peters Beach and separating it from Brigantine Island. Now known as Quarter Channel, it no longer connected directly with the ocean, but with Absecon Inlet.
By 1940, Quarters Channel had closed up, completing the connection with Brigantine Island.

References

Landforms of Atlantic County, New Jersey
Barrier islands of New Jersey
Islands of New Jersey
Brigantine, New Jersey